Boné Uaferro (born 4 January 1992) is a German-Mozambican professional footballer who plays as a centre-back for 3. Liga side 1. FC Saarbrücken. At international level, he represented the Germany U18 national team.

Career
A former youth international for Germany, Uaferro received his first senior call with Mozambique in July 2014.

He joined Regionalliga Südwest club 1. FC Saarbrücken on a one-year contract with the option a further year in June 2019.

References

External links 
 
 

1992 births
Living people
Footballers from Berlin
German footballers
German people of Mozambican descent
Mozambican footballers
Germany youth international footballers
Association football defenders
2. Bundesliga players
3. Liga players
1. FC Union Berlin players
FC Schalke 04 II players
SC Fortuna Köln players
1. FC Saarbrücken players